Thy Album Come is the first album by Nigerian rapper Ruggedman, it was released in 2005.

Track listing
"Intro" 1:00
"Ehen! (Pt.1) (featuring Nomoreloss)" 5:45
"Baraje (What U Got)" 5:13
"Peace Or War" 4:17
"Skit" 00:42
"Kokos Song (featuring C'Mion)" 4:16
"Where Ya @" 4:21
"I Am Ruggedman" 3:52
"Big Bros (Skit)" 1:26
"Big Bros (Uncensored)" 4:07
"Dublin Wit Luv" 4:14
"Wetin Dey (featuring Abounce & Jaffar)" 4:55
"Rugged And Josh Skit" 00:41
"French Connection (featuring Josh Of Tatu Clan (Congo))" 3:33
"Outro/Awards" 00:45
"Oh Oh [Bonus Track]" 3:38
"Ehen (Streetwise Remix) [Bonus Track]" 5:01

External links 
Official Website
Listen To Ruggedman's Album
Listen To This Album

2005 debut albums
Ruggedman albums